The Ghost Busters is a live-action children's sitcom that ran on CBS in 1975, about a team of bumbling detectives who investigate ghostly occurrences. Fifteen episodes were produced. The show reunited Forrest Tucker and Larry Storch in roles similar to their characters in F Troop.

The series is unrelated to the 1984 film Ghostbusters (although Columbia Pictures did pay Filmation a significant fee for a license to use the name). Like the film, the series spawned its own animated sequel in 1986.

The series utilizes slapstick, with scenes centered on the perpetual bumbling of the characters, good and evil alike. The series also makes references to classic cinema; the names "Spencer" and "Tracy" were taken from the actor Spencer Tracy, while the name Kong – not given to the gorilla – was a clear homage to King Kong.

Premise
Spencer, Tracy, and Kong billed themselves as "The Ghost Busters", bumbling paranormal detectives. Kong (Tucker) was the leader of the trio with Spencer (Storch) as his partner, and Tracy (a gorilla, played by Burns) as their assistant who also drove their barely-functional jalopy. Their headquarters was situated in a run down office building in an unspecified city (Spencer's name on the door was misspelled "Spenser" while the opening credits spelled his name "Spencer"). Outside of normal office equipment, plus a large armoire on which Tracy hung numerous hats including his trademark beanie with a propeller, the office itself was also dilapidated, with peeling wallpaper and a pay phone near the door as the Ghost Busters' only means of communicating with prospective clients.

Each episode consisted of the same formula: in the pre-credits teaser, a ghost or monster (usually accompanied by a half-witted sidekick), would manifest and vow to wreak havoc or vengeance on a particular person, the city, or even the world. After the credits, Kong would send Tracy and Spencer to a general store to get their next assignment from the unseen "Zero" (Scheimer). The tape-recorded message was usually hidden inside an everyday object such as a bicycle, typewriter, or toy. In a parodic homage to Mission: Impossible, the recording would end with Zero saying, "This message will self-destruct in five seconds"; after Tracy counted down the seconds, the message (and often the item in which it was hidden) would explode in Tracy's face.

The Ghost Busters' assignments would invariably take them to the same place, a spooky castle with an adjoining graveyard on the city's outskirts (Kong would point out that the castle was the only one in or near the city), and after a series of farcical chases, the ghouls would be cornered and dispatched back to the netherworld by a "Ghost De-Materializer", usually activated by Kong as he triumphantly shouted "Zap!"

Ghosts and monsters
The show frequently made use of ghostly characters and other characters from popular and literary culture, as well as real-life historical figures. These included:
 Dr. Frankenstein and his monster
 A Mummy
 The Red Baron
 The Canterville Ghost
 Count Dracula
 Billy the Kid
 Belle Starr
 The captain and first mate of the Flying Dutchman

Regular cast

Forrest Tucker as Jake Kong
Larry Storch as Eddie Spencer
Bob Burns as Tracy (credited as the gorilla's "trainer")
Lou Scheimer as the voice of Zero

Production
In an interview conducted with Bob Burns III in 2007, he revealed that all 15 episodes were taped in a span of 9 weeks, every other day. Burns also revealed that the show did well enough in the ratings to warrant a second season, coming in at number two behind The Shazam!/ISIS Hour, but Filmation decided instead to put more money into its number-one program, thus canceling the show after one season. Though the series ended, reruns were broadcast for some time afterward. Burns stated that it was rumored that the master tapes of all 15 episodes had been destroyed after having changed hands a few times. Fortunately, this rumor was put to rest when a full set of the master tapes (or copies) was re-discovered, and subsequently released on DVD.

Sequel
In 1986, after the success of the Columbia Ghostbusters film, the show was revived in animated format with Kong and Spencer's sons, Jake and Eddie Jr., inheriting their fathers' business (and Tracy the Gorilla) in Ghostbusters. Kong's first name was never mentioned in the original series. Spencer is named as Eddie in the second episode, "Dr. Whatsisname".

Home media
BCI Eclipse LLC (under its Ink & Paint classic animation entertainment label) (under license from Entertainment Rights PLC) released the entire series on DVD in Region 1 on April 17, 2007. This 2-Disc DVD boxset contains all 15 episodes from the original 1975 live-action series, uncut, re-mastered and transferred from the original broadcast videotapes, and presented in their original production order. It also contains extensive special features including interviews, photo galleries, rare footage and trailers from BCI's Ink & Paint brand. In addition, unlike many of BCI Ink & Paint's other Filmation releases, this DVD set appears to have been sourced from the original NTSC videotapes (the show having been recorded on tape rather than shot on film).

Prior to this, there were at least three VHS tapes released by Continental Video during the 1980s. These are now extremely hard to find. The show was billed as The Original Ghostbusters.

Australia received the complete series on DVD in a two-disc set on July 11, 2016.

As of 2009, this release has been discontinued and is out of print as BCI Eclipse has ceased 
operations.

Mill Creek Entertainment announced the re-release of the series on DVD.

Episodes

References

External links
 
 The Ghost Busters @ 70slivekidvid.com 
 Screencrush review of The Ghost Busters

1970s American sitcoms
1970s American children's television series
CBS original programming
1975 American television series debuts
1976 American television series endings
American children's television sitcoms
Television series by Filmation
Television series about ghosts
Occult detective fiction
Ghostbusters